The 1500 metres races were part of the Summer Paralympics program in 1980. The event was contested by both men and women.

Men's medal summaries

Ambulant athletes

Amputee athletes

Blind athletes

Intellectually impaired athletes

Wheelchair athletes

Women's medal summaries

Amputee athletes

Blind athletes

Intellectually impaired athletes

Wheelchair athletes

See also
Athletics at the Olympics
1500 metres at the Olympics

References

Athletics at the Summer Paralympics
Paralympic medalists in athletics (track and field)